A detonator is a device used to trigger an explosive device.

Other devices include:
 Detonator (railway), a railway device used to make a loud warning sound to train drivers

Detonator or The Detonator(s) may also refer to:

Books
 The Detonators, a novel in the Matt Helm series

Films and TV 
 Detonator, a 2003 film starring Randall Batinkoff and Elizabeth Berkley
 The Detonator, a 2006 film starring Wesley Snipes
 Death Train, also known as Detonator, a 1993 made-for-TV movie starring Pierce Brosnan and Patrick Stewart
 Detonator II: Night Watch, its 1995 sequel
 The Detonators (TV series), a documentary series on the Discovery Channel

Music
 Detonator, stage name of Brazilian singer and humorist Bruno Sutter
 Detonator (album), a 1990 music album by Ratt

Other uses 
 Detonator (game), a drinking game
 Detonator (Worlds of Fun), a "space shot" amusement park ride at Worlds of Fun in Kansas City, Missouri
 Detonator (Thorpe Park), a drop tower amusement park ride at Thorpe Park in Chertsey, Surrey, England
 Detonator, a 1998 Nvidia named driver for RIVA TNT graphics chip

See also
 
 
 Detonation (disambiguation)
 Detonator theory (disambiguation)